The Jaffna Diocese is the Church of South India diocese for northern Sri Lanka. The current bishop (known as the Bishop of Jaffna or the Bishop of the Church of South India in the Jaffna Diocese) is Rt.Rev.Dr.V.Pathmathayalan.

History
The Church of South India was established on 27 September 1947 as a union of the South India Provincial Synod of Methodist Church, the South India United Church (Congregational, Presbyterian and Reformed) and the southern dioceses of the Church of India, Pakistan, Burma and Ceylon (Anglican). The Jaffna Diocese of the Church of South India (JDCSI) was one of the 24 dioceses of the new church. Sabapathy Kulendran was enthroned as the first Bishop of Jaffna on 10 October 1947.

Bishops

References

External links
 Jaffna Diocese of the Church of South India

 
Jaffna
Anglicanism in Sri Lanka
Organisations based in Northern Province, Sri Lanka
Christian organizations established in 1947
1947 establishments in Ceylon